Shah Wajihuddin Alvi Gujarati, also known the epithet Haider Ali Saani, was an Islamic scholar and Sufi in the Shattari tradition.

Life
Shah Wajihudeen Alvi Hussaini Shattari (Haider Ali Saani) 'Ali the second' was born in Champaner, Gujarat in the last decade of the 15th century. He later moved to Ahmedabad where he received an education in Islamic studies. He taught Quranic studies, Islamic law, mathematics and logic for sixty-five years. He was initially a follower of the Qadiri Sufi tradition, but upon meeting Mohammed Ghaus Gwaliori he joined the Shattari Sufi tradition. Under his leadership, Ahmedabad became a major centre of Islamic studies, attracting students from all over India. Many of his disciples became prominent figures, including Syed Sibghatallah al-Barwaji, who moved to Medina and established the Shattari tradition in Saudi Arabia, Sheikh Abdul Qadir, who settled in Ujjain, and Sheikh Abu Turab, who moved to Lahore. He also had students from Bengal such as Usman and Yusuf, who contributed to Islamic education in medieval Hindustan. Wajihuddin wrote more than 200 books on various subjects.

According to some sources, Sayyadna Hashim Peer Dastagir was his nephew and Khalifa.

Works
Wajihuddin Alvi is reported to have written books in Arabic and Persian 

Hashiya Alvi Ala Tafsir Baydawi حاشية العلوي على تفسير البيضاوي

Sharh Nuzhat Al-Nazar شرح نزهة النظر للكجراتي مع نخبة الفكر للعسقلاني

Hashiya Alvi ala Sharh al-Jami https://archive.org/details/hashiya-alvi-ala-sharh-al-jami 

Risala Qushji Sharh Qushji

Aidah Haqiqat Sharh Haqiqat Muhamadi  ايضاح حقيقت  شرح حقيقت محمدي

Death and burial

He died in 1580 CE. He is buried in a memorial tomb in Khanpur, Ahmedabad, that was built by his disciple Syed Murtuza Khan Bukhari, the eleventh (1606–1609) governor of Ahmedabad during the reign of Jahangir.

References 

Indian Sufi saints
Sufi writers
Writers from Ahmedabad
15th-century Indian scholars
Indian Muslim scholars of Islam
Scholars from Gujarat
1580 deaths

Further reading
tazkiratul wajeeh by Syed Husaini Peer Alvi
Shah Wajeehuddin Alvi Gujrati Ahwal -o- Aasar by Abdur Rahman Parwaz Islahi
Khulasa-tul Wajih by Ahmed bin Muhammad Al-Farouqi
Life and works of Sheikh Wajihuddin Alavi Gujrati by Mohammad Khalid